Ludwigsstadt station is a railway station in the town of Ludwigsstadt, located in the Kronach district in Upper Franconia, Bavaria, Germany.

References

Railway stations in Bavaria
Buildings and structures in Kronach (district)